Mary Weston Fordham (c.1862–1905) was an African-American poet and teacher.

Biography 
Mary Weston Fordham was born in Charleston, South Carolina likely around the year 1843. Her parents were Louise Bonneau and Rev. Samuel Weston. Her parents and extended family were skilled laborers and land owners. She became a poet and an educator. She ran a school for African-American children during the Civil War. After the war, she worked as a teacher for the American Missionary Association. Her poetry indicates that she was the mother of six children, all of whom died.

Her collection Magnolia Leaves collected 66 poems that offers a presentation of African-American families following the American Civil War. The introduction to the book is written by Booker T. Washington, in which he reflects on his concerns for African-American families. In tone and subject, Fordham's poetry matches that of white female poets of the period: sentimentality, moral virtues, and explorations of death, motherhood, patriotism, and Christianity.

Published works 
 Fordham, Mary Weston (1897). Magnolia Leaves, Charleston: Walker, Evans & Cogswell Co.

References

Further reading 
 Gardner, Eric; Henry Louis Gates Jr.; and Evelyn Brooks Higginbotham (eds). "Mary Weston Fordham", African American National Biography, Oxford African American Studies Center
 Goven, Sandra Y.; and Jessie Carney Smith, editor (1996). "Mary Weston Fordham", Notable Black American Women

External links
 

1844 births
1905 deaths
African-American women writers
American women poets
African-American poets
19th-century American poets
19th-century American women writers
20th-century African-American people
20th-century African-American women